TKO Studios is an American comics publisher founded by Tze Chun and Salvatore Simeone in 2017.

History
TKO Studios was founded in 2017 by Tze Chun and Salvatore Simeone. Unlike the majority of other American comic book publishers, TKO sell their books directly to consumers and comic book shops, completely bypassing distributor Diamond Comic Distributors. In 2020, TKO Studios signed a deal Ingram Publisher Services / Publishers Group West to handle book distribution.

The first wave of books launched December 10, 2018 and contained four miniseries: The Fearsome Doctor Fang by Tze Chun, Mike Weiss, and Dan McDaid; Goodnight Paradise by Joshua Dysart and Alberto Ponticelli; Sara by Garth Ennis and Steve Epting; and The 7 Deadly Sins by Tze Chun and Artyom Trakhanov. Their first wave of books were all released in three formats; a trade paperback collection, a box set of single issues, and digitally in single or collected editions. During their initial release the first issue of each series was available free digitally so consumers and retailers could preview the series before purchasing the rest.

The second wave launched in October 28, 2019 using the same release format for another four miniseries: The Banks by Roxane Gay and Ming Doyle; Eve of Extinction by Salvatore Simeone, Steve Simeone, Nik Virella, and Isaac Goodhart; Pound for Pound by Natalie Chaidez and Andy Belanger; and Sentient by Jeff Lemire and Gabriel Walta.

In 2020, Sentient became the first title from TKO to be nominated for an Eisner Award, when the series picked up a nomination for Best Limited Series.

The third wave of books launched in November 9, 2020 with three comic book miniseries: Lonesome Days, Savage Nights by Steve Niles, Salvatore Simeone, and Szymon Kudranski; The Pull by Steve Orlando and Ricardo López Ortiz; and Redfork by Alex Paknadel and Nil Vandrell. In addition the three miniseries, TKO released an illustrated prose collection Blood Like Garnets by Leigh Harlen with illustrations by Maria Nguygen and a new series of one-shot comic books under the banner TKO Shorts with three titles Seeds of Eden, The Father of All Things and Night Train.

TKO Rogue
In November 2021, TKO announced TKO Rogue, an imprint focused on prose works. The first two books from this imprint will be Brood X and One Eye Open, coming out January 2022.

Published works

Comics miniseries

Comics shorts

Prose novels

Original graphic novels

1Originally published by Image Comics in 2017-2018 as Scales & Scoundrels #1-10

2Originally published by Image Comics in 2018 as Scales & Scoundrels #11-12 plus 250 pages of original content.

Media adaptions
In August 2020 The Banks was put into development as a feature film by production company MACRO with Gay returning to pen the script with Charles D. King, Poppy Hanks, Jelani Johnson, Salvatore Simeone, Tze Chun and Jatin Thakker serving as producers.

References

External links

2017 establishments in California
American companies established in 2017
Comic book publishing companies of the United States
Companies based in Los Angeles
Publishing companies established in 2017
Book publishing companies based in California